Carlos Pita González (born 8 December 1984) is a Spanish former professional footballer who played as a midfielder.

Club career

Deportivo
Pita was born in A Coruña, Galicia, and was a Deportivo de La Coruña youth graduate. After making his first-team debut in a 2–0 away win over CCD Cerceda in the second round of the Copa del Rey on 26 October 2004, he first appeared in La Liga on 29 May 2005, coming on as a late substitute for Aldo Duscher in the 1–1 away draw against CD Numancia.

In 2006, Pita moved on loan to Segunda División B club CD Logroñés. He returned to the Estadio Riazor in July of the following year, being assigned back to the reserves (now also in the third division) and subsequently representing Valencia CF Mestalla and CD Guadalajara in the same league.

Lugo
Pita was announced at fellow third-tier side CD Lugo in July 2010, and achieved promotion to the Segunda División at the end of the 2011–12 season under manager Quique Setién. He made his debut in the division on 18 August 2012, starting in a 1–0 home defeat of Hércules CF.

On 3 March 2018, aged 33, Pita scored his first brace as a professional, in the 2–1 victory against Granada CF also at the Estadio Anxo Carro. An undisputed starter during his spell, he appeared in 414 matches in all competitions, including 328 and 20 goals in division two. 

On 23 May 2022, Lugo announced the departure of 37-year-old Pita at the end of the season, along with fellow team captains Fernando Seoane and Iriome. He was immediately named the club's sporting director.

References

External links

1984 births
Living people
Spanish footballers
Footballers from A Coruña
Association football midfielders
La Liga players
Segunda División players
Segunda División B players
Tercera División players
Deportivo Fabril players
Deportivo de La Coruña players
CD Logroñés footballers
Valencia CF Mestalla footballers
CD Guadalajara (Spain) footballers
CD Lugo players